Pahargarh Estate was a Zamindari estate under the surganty of the Lodi Dynasty from 1441 to 1457 and later under the Mughal Empire, Jhansi State and British Raj.   Pahargarh is located in Madhya Pradesh, in Morena District, India. It was ruled by the Sikarwar Rajput of Maharaja Zamindar family of Pahargarh who were the descendants of Rao Anup Dev Sikarwar or his grandson Maharaja Kam Dev Sikarwar. When Kam Dev Sikarwar shifted to Ghazipur District in 1530 the estate was handled by his second, third, and fourth sons' family. Half of their family went with Kam Dev in Ghazipur District in Uttar Pradesh and half lived in Pahargarh Estate. The first ruler of Pahargarh Estate was Rao Anup Dev Sikarwar, who was originally a ruler of Viajypur Sikri (Fatehpur Sikri) but later captured parts of Morena, Gwalior and Jhansi and established Pahargarh and built Pahargarh Fort.

References

History of India
Lodi dynasty
Madhya Pradesh